Maria da Conceição Cortes de Moura Padrão Caetano (born 7 November 1986) is a Portuguese dressage rider. She competed at two World Equestrian Games (in 2014 and 2018), and at six European Dressage Championships, from 2009 through 2019.

Caetano's current career-high championship result is 6th place achieved in team dressage at the 2017 European Championships. Her best individual finish is 22nd place from the same event.

Dressage results

Olympic Games

World Championships

European Championships

World Cup

Final

Western European League

Q - denotes qualification for the World Cup Final

Western European League podiums
3 podiums (0 gold, 1 silver, 2 bronze)

References

Living people
1986 births
People from Monforte, Portugal
Portuguese female equestrians
Portuguese dressage riders
Equestrians at the 2020 Summer Olympics
Olympic equestrians of Portugal
Sportspeople from Portalegre District